Sokolovo (Bulgarian, Russian and ) may refer to:

Places 
Sokolovo, Serbia
Sokolovo, Ukraine, village in Kharkiv Oblast, place of the World War II battle
Sokolovo, Burgas Province, Bulgaria
Sokolovo, Dobrich Province, Bulgaria
Sokolovo, Gabrovo Province, Bulgaria
Sokolovo, Lovech Province, Bulgaria
Donje Sokolovo, Bosnia and Herzegovina
Gornje Sokolovo, Bosnia and Herzegovina
Golyamo Sokolovo, Targovishte Municipality, Bulgaria

In popular culture 
Sokolovo (film), 1974 Czechoslovak war film directed by Otakar Vávra, depicting the Battle of Sokolovo

See also
Sokołowo (disambiguation)
Sokolov (disambiguation)
Sokolić, surname
Sokolović, a surname
Sokolovići (disambiguation)
Sokolovac (disambiguation)
Sokol (disambiguation)
Soko (disambiguation)